Auguste Encrine (born 21 June 1906, date of death unknown) was an Italian-born French racing cyclist. He rode in the 1929 Tour de France.

References

External links
 

1906 births
Year of death missing
French male cyclists
Italian male cyclists
Italian emigrants to France
Sportspeople from Genoa
French Army personnel of World War II
Cyclists from Liguria